The Devil's Pay Day is a 1917 American silent drama film directed by William Worthington and starring Franklyn Farnum, Leah Baird and Gertrude Astor.

Cast
 Franklyn Farnum as Gregory Van Houten
 Leah Baird as Jean Haskins
 Gertrude Astor as Hazel Davidson
 Charles Perley as James Hanley
 Countess Du Cello as Mrs. Haskins
 Seymour Hastings as Mr. Haskins

References

Bibliography
 Lowe, Denise. An Encyclopedic Dictionary of Women in Early American Films: 1895-1930. Routledge, 2014.

External links
 

1917 films
1917 drama films
1910s English-language films
American silent feature films
Silent American drama films
American black-and-white films
Universal Pictures films
Films directed by William Worthington
1910s American films